A shadoof or shaduf (from the Arabic word , šādūf) is an irrigation tool. It is highly efficient, and has been known since 3000 BCE.

The shadoof is used to lift water from a water source onto land or into another waterway or basin. The mechanism comprises a long counterbalanced pole on a pivot, with a bucket attached to the end of it. It is generally used in a crop irrigation system using basins, dikes, ditches, walls, canals, and similar waterways.

Names
It is also called a lift, well pole, well sweep, or simply a sweep in the US. A less common English translation is swape. Picotah (or picota) is a Portuguese loan word.  It is also called a jiégāo (桔槹) in Chinese. The Tamil name is thulla (துலா), while the Telugu name is ethaamu (ఏతాము) or ethamu (ఏతము). It was also known by the Ancient Greek name kēlōn or kēlōneion; this term (קילון) is also borrowed in Mishnaic Hebrew.

History
The shadoof was first used in irrigation around 3000 BCE by the Mesopotamians, 2000 BCE by the ancient Egyptians, and later by the Minoans, Chinese (c 1600 BCE), and others.

It is still used in many areas of Africa and Asia and is very common in rural areas of India and Pakistan, such as the Bhojpuri belt of the Ganges plain, where it is called a dhenki. They remain common in Hungary's Great Plain, where they are known as gémeskút (literally, "heron wells") and are considered a symbol of the region.

Construction
The shadoof is easy to construct and is highly efficient in use. 
It consists of an upright frame on which is suspended a long pole or branch, at a distance of about one-fifth of its length from one end. At the long end of this pole hangs a bucket, skin bag, or bitumen-coated reed basket. The bucket can be made in many different styles, sometimes having an uneven base or a part at the top of the skin that can be untied. This allows the water to be immediately distributed rather than manually emptied. The short end carries a weight made of clay, stone, or a similar material, which serves as the counterpoise of a lever. The bucket can be lowered by the operator using their own weight to push it down; the counterweight then raises the full bucket without effort. 

With an almost effortless swinging and lifting motion, the waterproof vessel can be used to scoop up and carry water from a body of water (typically, a river or pond) onto land or to another body of water. At the end of each movement, the water is emptied out into runnels that convey the water along irrigation ditches in the required direction.

The shadoof has a lifting range of 1 to 6 meters. A study of efficiency in various sites in Chad has shown that one man can lift 39 to 130 liters per minute over heights of 1.8 to 6.2 m,  resulting in water-lifting power levels of 26.7 to 60.1 W. Its efficiency has been calculated at 60%.

References

External links

The Shaduf Project: A European Commission Report on Mediterranean Shaduf Use and History

Irrigation
Water wells
Ancient Egyptian technology